Hedwig of France (c. 970 – after 1013), also called Avoise, Hadevide or Haltude, was Countess of Mons. She was the daughter of Hugh Capet, the first King of France, and his wife, Queen Adelaide of Aquitaine.

Family
In 996 Hedwig married Reginar IV of Hainaut (947–1013). Their children were:
 Reginar V, Count of Mons
 Gisèle (998-1049), who married Wautier III d'Olhain
 Lambert 
 Beatrix, who married Ebles I, Count of Rheims and Roucy
 Ermentrude, died at the age of two or three; buried in the Collegiate Church of Saint Gertrude in Nivelles, Belgium. The burial came to light during an excavation. A lead cross, inscribed with her name and that of her parents, was found in the tomb.

Death
Following the death of her first husband, Hedwig remarried to Hugh de Dagsbourg. She died after 1013.

References

Sources

970s births
1013 deaths
Hedwig
French princesses
French countesses
County of Hainaut
Place of birth unknown
Place of death unknown
10th-century French people
10th-century French women
11th-century French people
11th-century French women
Daughters of kings